Avant is the self-titled fifth studio album by American singer Avant. It was released on December 9, 2008 on Capitol Records. Its first single, "When It Hurts" reached number 91 on the US Billboard Hot 100 and number 15 on the Hot R&B/Hip-Hop Songs chart. Its second single was "Break Ya Back (In a Good Way)".

Critical reception

Andy Kellman from Allmusic rated the album three and a half stars out of five. He felt that "on Avant, he goes both harder and softer [...] In between two poles is a typical Avant album, no bad thing. The album, in fact, contains the best opening three-song sequence of his career."

Track listing

Notes
 denotes co-producer

Charts

Weekly charts

Year-end charts

References

2008 albums
Avant albums
Capitol Records albums